Pearly Shells (Pupu A ʻO ʻEwa) is a Hawaiian folk song. The English lyrics were written by Webley Edwards and Leon Pober.

Recordings
Don Ho (1964)
Burl Ives (1960) on Burl Ives Sings Pearly Shells and Other Favorites
Arthur Lyman (1964)
The Waikikis (1967)
The Melbourne Ukulele Kollective
Trío los Panchos (1966)
Nora Aunor (1971) on Blue Hawaii
 Slim Whitman (1977), recorded it on his Home on the Range album
 Billy Vaughn (1964)
 Ray Conniff (1967), recorded it on his Hawaiian Album.

John Ford's 1963 movie Donovan's Reef utilized the song as its opening theme as well as in later scenes.

In the 1970s, C&H Sugar used the melody for their jingle

References

External links
"Pearly Shells" and the Hawaiian History Behind the Melody.

American folk songs
Hawaiian music